Malý Cetín is a village and municipality in the Nitra District in western central Slovakia, in the Nitra Region.

History
In historical records, the village was first mentioned in 1113.

Geography
The village lies at an altitude of 129 metres and covers an area of 5.159 km². It has a population of about 381 people.

Ethnicity
The village is approximately 91% Slovak and 9% Magyar.

Facilities
The village has a public library.

References

External links
 
 
https://www.webcitation.org/5QjNYnAux?url=http://www.statistics.sk/mosmis/eng/run.html

Villages and municipalities in Nitra District